Shandy is beer or cider mixed with a lemon or a lemon-lime flavored beverage. The citrus beverage, often called lemonade, may or may not be carbonated. The proportions of the two ingredients are adjusted to taste but are usually half lemonade and half beer/cider, resulting in a lower ABV for the finished drink. Shandies are popular in the UK, Europe, Australia, New Zealand, South Africa, and Canada (where they are sometimes known by the French name Panaché).

In some jurisdictions, the low alcohol content of shandies exempts them from laws governing the sale of alcoholic beverages.

Etymology
The debated origin of the term (recorded first in 1888) is shortened from shandygaff, from Britain in 1853 and itself of obscure source.

Variants by name 

Shandy is a popular drink in UK and is usually ordered as either "bitter shandy" (50/50 bitter beer and fizzy lemonade) or "lager shandy" in which lager is substituted for the ale.

Radler 
Radler (German for "cyclist") has a long history in German-speaking regions. It commonly consists of a 50:50 mixture of beer and a lemon-flavored soda like Sprite.

The term Radler originates with a drink called Radlermass ("cyclist litre") that was created by innkeeper Franz Kugler in the small town of Deisenhofen, just outside Munich. During the great cycling boom of the Roaring Twenties, Kugler created a bicycle trail from Munich through the woods that led directly to his drinking establishment. On a June day in 1922, 13,000 cyclists arrived at Kugler’s. He blended it 50/50 with lemon soda as he started to run out of beer.

While the term Radler has been widely attributed to Kugler, the combination of beer and soda is documented in texts dating from 1912. Nowadays, Radler is consumed not only in Bavaria, but also in all of Germany, Austria, Czech Republic, Hungary, Italy, Slovakia, Slovenia, Croatia, Serbia, Poland, Portugal, Netherlands, Norway, Bulgaria, United States, Canada, and Romania.

In northern Germany, a half-and-half mix of Pilsner beer and soda is known as an Alster (short for Alsterwasser, German for "Water from the Alster", a river in Hamburg). Regionally the Radler and Alster may refer to shandies made with either citrus soda or orange soda, with the two terms either contrasting or referring to the same drink. In Hamburg, Alsterwasser may also be made with cola, in reference to the supposed appearance of the actual river. In Austria, a saure Radler is a mix of lager and soda water.

In Austria, it is common to use Almdudler instead of lemon soda for the Radler.

Radler is very popular during the summer months due to its reputation of being a thirst-quencher.

In New Zealand, the word "radler" was trademarked by DB Breweries for their "Monteith's Radler" beer, which is a citrus-flavoured, full-strength (5%) beer. This has led to some brewers to use the names "reldar" (Radler spelled backwards) and "Cyclist" (the literal meaning of Radler).

In the Netherlands, shandy and Radler are largely seen as two different drinks, shandy being a 0,5% alcohol drink popular as a kids' beer since/in the 70s, officially as not >0.5% seen as non-alcoholic, and on the other hand the classic Radler, known from Germany, and since a decade or so also sold as pre-mixed drinks in increasing popularity by most large Dutch beer brewers in increasing variants.

Russ 
In Bavaria, the southeastern state of Germany, as well as in the countryside of Austria, a mix of 50% Weißbier and 50% lemon soda is called a "Russ". There are three different theories about the origin of this name:
 Due to a shortage of raw materials that occurred during the great inflation between 1921 and 1923, Weißbier became more popular. To further reduce material efforts, the Weißbier was thinned with lemonade. The name "Russ" may derive from the popularity of the drink among Russian workers in Germany at that time.
 Another theory of the name's origin is that the drink initially was called "Riesen-Maß" (Riesen = giant), as the drink mixture frothed heavily.
 The most popular theory is that the drink was first served in the Mathäser-Keller in Munich after the 1918 Revolution when communists came together.

Shandygaff 
A Shandygaff is an older British name for beer mixed with ginger beer or ginger ale; the earliest written record of the word dates back to 1853.  In H. G. Wells’ comic novel The History of Mr Polly, Wells refers to Shandygaff as "two bottles of beer mixed with ginger beer in a round-bellied jug".

Lager top 
In England, Wales and Scotland, a lager top is a lager with a dash of lemonade on top, the latter of which reduces the lager's hardness.

Monaco 

Clara 
In Spain, a clara is typically any mixture of beer with a sweet-tasting carbonated soft drink (in order to reduce the bitterness of the hops). The addition of soda lightens the color of the beer, hence its name (clara means "clear" in Spanish). It is usually served as a refreshment in the hot summer months, being a very popular drink. Other regions have different names for the mixture, and there is a debate over whether a clara refers to beer with lemon, or beer with a soft drink.

See also 
 Beer cocktail
 Michelada
Queen Mary (beer cocktail)

References

External links 

Types of beer
Cocktails with beer